Cazal is a French surname. Notable people with the surname include:

Iván Cazal (born 1999), Paraguayan footballer 
Jérôme Cazal (born 1973), French handball player
Louis Cazal (1901–1945), French footballer and manager
Olivier Cazal (born 1962), French classical pianist
Patrick Cazal (born 1971), French handball player

Cazal may also refer to Cazal Eyewear, a luxury sunglass brand.

French-language surnames